Alexandra Lunca (born 22 August 1995) is a Romanian football striker currently playing in the Romanian First League for Fortuna Becicherecu Mic, with which she has also played the Champions League. She is a member of the Romanian national team having made her official debut in November 2011 against Spain at 16, and as a junior international she subsequently played the 2012 U-19 European Championship.

Notable goals

Titles
In its five years, five national doubles were won.
 6 Romanian championships: 2011, 2012, 2013, 2014, 2015, 2016
 5 Romanian Women's Cup: 2011, 2012, 2013, 2014, 2015

References

1995 births
Living people
Romanian women's footballers
Romania women's international footballers
Women's association football forwards
FCU Olimpia Cluj players